Scott D. Thompson (born 9 May 1986) is a former Australian rules footballer who played for the North Melbourne Football Club in the Australian Football League (AFL). He was selected 37th overall in the 2007 AFL Draft by North Melbourne.

Early career
As a teenager, Thompson starred in the Geelong Football League. Playing his preferred position of full back, Thompson played a key role in Geelong's VFL premiership side in 2007, his heroic actions stopping a key forward about 30 kg heavier than him in the 2006 grand final, has become legend at his local club, South Barwon.

Thompson has said that playing on the big forwards of the GFL gave him a platform to build his whole AFL career on.

North Melbourne
Thompson made his debut for the Kangaroos in 2008, playing 6 games for the season.

Thompson played every game in 2009, his best season to date, and has claimed some big scalps, including Port Adelaide's Warren Tredrea, Magpie Jack Anthony, Essendon veteran Matthew Lloyd and Brisbane spearhead Daniel Bradshaw, whom he kept goalless in 103 minutes of playing time in Round 10. Thompson has been dubbed 'Mr. Annoying,' as several of his opponents have been sent to the tribunal for responding to his niggling tactics, including Cameron Mooney and Jack Anthony, who headbutted him in the groin.

On 22 May 2010 he was the centre of attention when he pushed over Western Bulldogs player Barry Hall whilst tying his shoelace, triggering an ugly altercation between Hall and several other Kangaroos players. Hall reacted to the taunts by putting Thompson in a headlock and was subsequently reported for both wrestling and rough conduct.

All Australian team selector, Gerard Healy commented that Thompson's incredible performance this year is unheralded to date, and suggested that he was a definite contender for full back on the All Australian team.

Thompson scored his first AFL goal in 2010 against West Coast and scored 2 the following year against Sydney. All 3 goals were from outside 50.

Thompson was runner up for The Syd Barker Medal (NMFC Best and Fairest) in 2009 and 2012 coming second to Captain Andrew Swallow on both occasions.

In 2012 Thompson also recorded a career high in disposals (39) against The Giants.

In 2013 Thompson was announced in North Melbournes leadership group for the 2013 season and onwards with Andrew Swallow, Drew Petrie, Jack Ziebell, Daniel Wells, Brent Harvey and Taylor Hine. He won the 2013 Syd Barker Medal after an excellent and consistent year, tying with teammate Daniel Wells.

Thompson had a great start to his 2014 season, including holding Lance Franklin goalless in the side's road win against Sydney in Round 4. However, Thompson finished up the season disappointingly but enhancing his offensive game was a huge positive for him.

Thompson retired at the completion of the 2019 season after announcing it earlier in the year.  He was still one of the first picked each week in his final season.

Statistics
 

|- style="background-color: #EAEAEA"
! scope="row" style="text-align:center" | 2008
|style="text-align:center;"|
| 37 || 6 || 0 || 0 || 44 || 27 || 71 || 27 || 8 || 0.0 || 0.0 || 7.3 || 4.5 || 11.8 || 4.5 || 1.3
|-
! scope="row" style="text-align:center" | 2009
|style="text-align:center;"|
| 16 || 22 || 0 || 0 || 170 || 178 || 348 || 102 || 57 || 0.0 || 0.0 || 7.7 || 8.1 || 15.8 || 4.6 || 2.6
|- style="background-color: #EAEAEA"
! scope="row" style="text-align:center" | 2010
|style="text-align:center;"|
| 16 || 22 || 1 || 2 || 165 || 215 || 380 || 87 || 54 || 0.0 || 0.1 || 7.5 || 9.8 || 17.3 || 4.0 || 2.5
|-
! scope="row" style="text-align:center" | 2011
|style="text-align:center;"|
| 16 || 22 || 2 || 2 || 197 || 196 || 393 || 102 || 60 || 0.1 || 0.1 || 9.0 || 8.9 || 17.9 || 4.6 || 2.7
|- style="background-color: #EAEAEA"
! scope="row" style="text-align:center" | 2012
|style="text-align:center;"|
| 16 || 21 || 0 || 3 || 184 || 203 || 387 || 123 || 48 || 0.0 || 0.1 || 8.8 || 9.7 || 18.4 || 5.9 || 2.3
|-
! scope="row" style="text-align:center" | 2013
|style="text-align:center;"|
| 16 || 19 || 2 || 0 || 228 || 144 || 372 || 124 || 42 || 0.1 || 0.0 || 12.0 || 7.6 || 19.6 || 6.5 || 2.2
|- style="background-color: #EAEAEA"
! scope="row" style="text-align:center" | 2014
|style="text-align:center;"|
| 16 || 24 || 1 || 1 || 226 || 171 || 397 || 138 || 47 || 0.0 || 0.0 || 9.4 || 7.1 || 16.5 || 5.8 || 2.0
|-
! scope="row" style="text-align:center" | 2015
|style="text-align:center;"|
| 16 || 24 || 0 || 0 || 203 || 146 || 349 || 114 || 44 || 0.0 || 0.0 || 8.5 || 6.1 || 14.5 || 4.8 || 1.8
|- style="background-color: #EAEAEA"
! scope="row" style="text-align:center" | 2016
|style="text-align:center;"|
| 16 || 19 || 0 || 1 || 164 || 111 || 275 || 94 || 32 || 0.0 || 0.1 || 8.6 || 5.8 || 14.5 || 4.9 || 1.7
|-
! scope="row" style="text-align:center" | 2017
|style="text-align:center;"|
| 16 || 21 || 1 || 1 || 168 || 154 || 322 || 108 || 52 || 0.0 || 0.0 || 8.0 || 7.3 || 15.3 || 5.1 || 2.5
|- style="background-color: #EAEAEA"
! scope="row" style="text-align:center" | 2018
|style="text-align:center;"|
| 16 || 22 || 0 || 0 || 211 || 121 || 332 || 124 || 49 || 0.0 || 0.0 || 9.6 || 5.5 || 15.1 || 5.6 || 2.2
|-
! scope="row" style="text-align:center" | 2019
|style="text-align:center;"|
| 16 || 19 || 0 || 0 || 195 || 94 || 289 || 89 || 35 || 0.0 || 0.0 || 10.3 || 4.9 || 15.2 || 4.7 || 1.8
|- class="sortbottom"
! colspan=3| Career
! 241
! 7
! 10
! 2155
! 1760
! 3915
! 1232
! 528
! 0.0
! 0.0
! 8.9
! 7.3
! 16.2
! 5.1
! 2.2
|}

References

External links

1986 births
Living people
North Melbourne Football Club players
All-Australians (AFL)
Syd Barker Medal winners
South Barwon Football Club players
Australian rules footballers from Geelong